Chicagon Lake is a small lake in Iron County, Michigan.

See also
List of lakes in Michigan

References

Lakes of Michigan
Bodies of water of Iron County, Michigan